Jay Matete (born 11 February 2001) is an English professional footballer who plays as a midfielder for EFL League One side Plymouth Argyle, on loan from Sunderland

Career

Fleetwood Town
In May 2018, Matete signed for Fleetwood Town's academy, following a spell at Reading. During the 2019–20 EFL Trophy, made two appearances for Fleetwood, against Liverpool U21 and Oldham Athletic.

Grimsby Town (loan)
On 21 January 2021, Matete signed for Grimsby Town on loan until the end of the 2020–21 season. Matete played in 20 games for The Mariners, scoring his first goal for the club 32 seconds into a EFL League Two tie with Bolton Wanderers in which Town ran out eventual 2-1 winners.

He scored the winner in a 2–1 win at Oldham Athletic, with a brilliant solo strike having run from the halfway line before hitting a shot into the top corner. A few days later he scored again away at Exeter City to give The Mariners a 2–1 lead, but was later sent off as Grimsby eventually lost 3–2 confirming relegation from the Football League. The club appealed his red card but this was turned down effectively ending his season.

Sunderland
On 31 January 2022, Matete signed for fellow EFL League One side Sunderland on a four-year contract for an undisclosed fee. Matete said upon signing "I’m delighted to sign for a club of this stature and I can’t wait to get started. Everything happened so quickly, but it’s brilliant to get the deal done and I’m excited for what the future holds.

On 6 January 2023, Matete signed for Plymouth Argyle on loan until the end of the 2022–23 season.

Career statistics

Honours

Sunderland
 EFL League One play-offs: 2022

References

2001 births
Living people
Association football midfielders
English footballers
Reading F.C. players
Fleetwood Town F.C. players
Grimsby Town F.C. players
Sunderland A.F.C. players
Plymouth Argyle F.C. players
English Football League players
Black British sportspeople
English people of Democratic Republic of the Congo descent